Rory Couper (born 6 June 1980 in Irvine, Scotland) is a former Scotland 7s international rugby union player. He played as a Wing.

Rugby Union career

Amateur career

He played at amateur level for Ardrossan Academicals RFC.

In 2000, Couper was playing for Boroughmuir RFC. web|url=http://www.scotsman.com/sport/sweet-revenge-for-heriot-s-1-1352103|title=Sweet revenge for Heriot}}</ref>

Professional career

Glasgow Warriors

His talent was noticed by the Glasgow District Rugby Union. The GDRU had organised a Glasgow Warriors 'academy project' team, the Glasgow Thistles, which would receive their training in New Zealand in the summer of 1998. Couper received a place in the Glasgow Thistles 22-man squad.

The next season 1998–99 Couper, and his Glasgow Thistle team-mate Rory Kerr, trained with the Glasgow squad, but they did not play. Instead, they were still playing for their amateur clubs.

Both Kerr and Couper broke into the Glasgow Warriors squad the following season 1999 - 2000. Kerr broke into the first team that season, but Couper found himself on the bench. He was a substitute in Glasgow's last match in the Welsh-Scottish League that season, an away tie with Neath RFC. Glasgow were beaten 47 - 10 and Coupar did not play. The squad placing and named as an unused substitute was as close as Couper came to playing a competitive match for Glasgow Warriors.

He did play in a friendly match for Glasgow Warriors. In 2004 he was part of the Glasgow side that played the Scotland U21 side.

This was a preparation match for the national Under-21 side in order to get them ready for the Under 21 Rugby World Cup. Playing against the Warriors proved a step too far for the Under 21s and they were beaten 43 - 0. Couper helped himself to a brace of tries.

Edinburgh

Shortly after his Glasgow appearance, Couper was picked up by Edinburgh Rugby and played in a Celtic League match against Llanelli Scarlets on 6 March 2004.

International career

Couper captained the Scotland Under-19 team.

Internationally, Couper made the Scotland Sevens team.

References

External links
The Scotsman profile

1980 births
Living people
Ardrossan Academicals players
Boroughmuir RFC players
Edinburgh Academicals rugby union players
Edinburgh Rugby players
Glasgow Warriors players
Male rugby sevens players
Rugby union players from Irvine, North Ayrshire
Scotland Club XV international rugby union players
Scotland international rugby sevens players
Scottish rugby union players